Shawn Robert Ashmore (born October 7, 1979) is a Canadian actor. He is known for his roles as Bobby Drake / Iceman in the X-Men film series, Jake Berenson in the television series Animorphs, Agent Mike Weston in the television drama series The Following, Eric in the horror film The Ruins, Sam Spencer in the ABC series Conviction, Wesley Evers in the ABC series The Rookie, and Lamplighter in the Amazon Prime Video superhero series The Boys. Ashmore also plays the main character, Jack Joyce, in the 2016 video game Quantum Break, as well as Conrad in 2019's Man of Medan. He is the identical twin brother of actor Aaron Ashmore.

Early life
Ashmore was born in Richmond, British Columbia, the son of Linda (née Davis), a homemaker, and Rick Ashmore, a manufacturing engineer. He was raised in St. Albert, Alberta and Brampton, Ontario, where he attended Earnscliffe Senior Public School and Turner Fenton Secondary School. His twin brother, Aaron Ashmore, is also an actor. Aaron and Shawn have played twins in several movies, but have also pursued roles independently. Aaron is slightly taller than Shawn and, according to Aaron, Shawn often gets cast as the nice guy while Aaron himself is cast as the bully. They have a "GMA" tattoo on their wrists that stands for "Good Man Ashmore"; their grandfather had a similar tattoo.

Career

One of Ashmore's notable roles was as Iceman in X-Men and its sequels X2 and X-Men: The Last Stand. Ashmore also reprised his role as Iceman in the animated series The Super Hero Squad Show, as well as voicing the role for X-Men: The Official Game.

Ashmore starred as Cadet Major Brad Rigby in Cadet Kelly, a Disney Channel original film which aired in 2002 and he guest-starred as Eric Summers in two episodes of Smallville, a series on which his brother was later cast in the role of Jimmy Olsen. Ashmore had starring roles on Animorphs as Jake Berenson and In a Heartbeat as Tyler Connell.

In December 2004, Ashmore was cast in the lead role in the SciFi Channel mini series Legend of Earthsea, based on the novels by Ursula K. Le Guin. He played the role of Ged, a young wizard-in-training, who takes advice from a Magus (Danny Glover) and falls in love with Tenar (Kristin Kreuk), the protege of the High Priestess of the Tombs of Atuan (Isabella Rossellini).

In 2005, Ashmore starred in a CTV TV movie about Terry Fox's historic run across Canada, which aired in September of that year. In 2008, he starred as one of the leads in the 2008 horror film The Ruins. Ashmore was cast in Adam Green's 2010 dramatic thriller Frozen as Joe Lynch.

Ashmore starred in the apocalyptic siege warfare film The Day with Dominic Monaghan, Michael Eklund, Shannyn Sossamon, and Ashley Bell. Ashmore also starred in the television drama series The Following, starring Kevin Bacon. He reprised his role as Iceman in the 2014 film X-Men: Days of Future Past.

In April 2016, Shawn appeared in Quantum Break, a singleplayer third-person shooter video game developed by Remedy Entertainment and published by Microsoft Studios, that features high budget live action TV show-like cut scenes where Shawn plays the main character, Jack Joyce. He also did the motion capture and voice acting for the character.

From October 2016 to January 2017, he played the role of Sam Spencer on the U.S. legal drama Conviction. The series was filmed in Toronto.

In 2020, Ashmore recurred in the second season of the Amazon Prime Video superhero series The Boys as Lamplighter, a former member of the superhero group the Seven.

Personal life
On July 27, 2012, Ashmore married film executive Dana Renee Wasdin, whom he met while filming Frozen. The couple has one son, born in 2017.

Filmography

Film

Television

Video games

References

External links
 
 

1979 births
Canadian male child actors
Canadian male film actors
Canadian male video game actors
Canadian male voice actors
Film producers from British Columbia
Canadian male television actors
Identical twin male actors
Living people
Male actors from British Columbia
People from Richmond, British Columbia
Canadian twins
20th-century Canadian male actors
21st-century Canadian male actors